Huddie William Ledbetter  (January 20, 1888 – December 6, 1949) was an American folk and blues musician notable for his strong vocals, virtuosity on the twelve-string guitar, and the folk standards he introduced. He is best known as Lead Belly.

Lead Belly's songs covered a wide range of genres and topics including gospel music; blues about women, liquor, prison life, and racism; and folk songs about cowboys, prison, work, sailors, cattle herding, and dancing. He also wrote songs about people in the news, such as Franklin D. Roosevelt, Adolf Hitler, Jean Harlow, Jack Johnson, the Scottsboro Boys and Howard Hughes.

Lead Belly's work has been widely covered by subsequent musical acts, including:

References

Lists of cover songs
Lead Belly songs